Ali Gabr Gabr Mossad (born 1 January 1989) is an Egyptian professional footballer who plays for Egyptian Premier League side Pyramids and the Egyptian national team as a centre-back.

Club career

Zamalek SC
Gabr signed for Zamalek in June 2014. His performances resulted in his selection for the Egyptian national team. Zamalek won the Egyptian Premier league 2014–15.

West Bromwich Albion
On 29 January 2018, Gabr joined West Bromwich Albion  on a six-month loan deal worth €500,000 with a €2.5 million option to buy at the end of the season with Zamalek retaining a 10% sell-on clause.

Pyramids
On 10 July 2018, Gabr joined Pyramids after West Bromwich turned down the option to sign the defender on a permanent deal.

International career
He was called up for the national team under Shawky Gharib on 4 June 2014 in a friendly game against Jamaica.

In May 2018, Gabr was named in Egypt's squad for the 2018 World Cup in Russia.

Career statistics

International

Honours
Zamalek
Egyptian Premier League: 2014–15
Egypt Cup: 2014–15, 2015–16
Egyptian Super Cup: 2016

Egypt
Africa Cup of Nations: Runner-up 2017

References

External links

1989 births
Living people
Egyptian footballers
Egypt international footballers
Egyptian expatriate footballers
Egyptian expatriate sportspeople in England
Sportspeople from Alexandria
Association football defenders
Ismaily SC players
Al Ittihad Alexandria Club players
Zamalek SC players
2017 Africa Cup of Nations players
West Bromwich Albion F.C. players
Egyptian Premier League players
Premier League players
2018 FIFA World Cup players
Pyramids FC players